The second season of the  Family Matters originally aired on ABC between September 21, 1990 and May 3, 1991. From this season onward, Bryton McClure and Jaleel White are joining the cast in the opening credits.

Premise
In season two, after Leroy quits his job at Leroy's Place, because Steve burns the restaurant down, Rachel is promoted to open up her new diner titled Rachel's Place, earning her new employee members Steve and Laura.

Main cast 

 Reginald VelJohnson as Carl Winslow
 Jo Marie Payton as Harriette Winslow
 Rosetta LeNoire as Estelle Winslow
 Darius McCrary as Eddie Winslow
 Kellie Shanygne Williams as Laura Winslow
 Jaimee Foxworth as Judy Winslow
 Bryton McClure as Richie Crawford
 Jaleel White as Steve Urkel
 Telma Hopkins as Rachel Crawford

Episodes

References 

1990 American television seasons
1991 American television seasons